There are several Jewish and Hebrew greetings, farewells, and phrases that are used in Judaism, and in Jewish and Hebrew-speaking communities around the world. Even outside Israel, Hebrew is an important part of Jewish life.  Many Jews, even if they do not speak Hebrew fluently, will know several of these greetings (most are Hebrew,  and among Ashkenazim some are Yiddish).

Shabbat
For the Sabbath, there are several greetings that Jews use to greet one another.

Holidays
For different chagim and Yom Tov there are different expressions used.

Greetings and farewells

There are several greetings and good-byes used in Hebrew to say hello and farewell to someone.

Phrases
These are Hebrew phrases used in Jewish communities both inside and outside of Israel.

See also
Honorifics in Judaism
Honorifics for the dead in Judaism

References

Hebrew words and phrases
Greeting words and phrases
Yiddish words and phrases